Cardi is an Italian surname. Notable people with the surname include:

Beatrice de Cardi (1914–2016), British archaeologist
Lodovico Cardi (1559–1613), Italian painter and architect better known as Cigoli 
Ezio Cardi (born 1948), Italian cyclist

See also
Cardi B, American rapper
Cardy (surname)
Cardigan (sweater)
 Pat Cardi - an American Film and Television actor 

Italian-language surnames